Reginald Keith Phillips (born December 12, 1960) is a former American football cornerback in the National Football League (NFL). He played for the Chicago Bears (1985–1987) and Phoenix Cardinals (1988).  Phillips attended Southern Methodist University and Jack Yates Senior High School in Houston.

Phillips was a member of the 1985 Bears that won Super Bowl XX, returning an interception for a touchdown in that game. He was also a member of the "Shuffling Crew" in the video The Super Bowl Shuffle.

References

1960 births
Living people
Players of American football from Houston
American football cornerbacks
SMU Mustangs football players
Chicago Bears players
Phoenix Cardinals players